Chow Lien-hwa (7 March 1920 – 6 August 2016) was a Chinese Baptist minister, missionary, and theologian.

He was a recognized Christian leader in Taiwan, serving as chaplain to Taiwan's former presidents Chiang Kai-shek, Chiang Ching-kuo, and Lee Teng-hui.

Life 
Born in Shanghai, Chow graduated from the University of Shanghai in business management, before going to the United States in 1949 to study theology, completing his BDiv (1951) and PhD (1954) from Southern Baptist Theological Seminary. He would later conduct post-doctoral research at Princeton Theological Seminary and be a visiting scholar at Oxford University.

He was the president of Asia Baptist Graduate Theological Seminary (1993–2005).

References

Further reading 
 

1920 births
2016 deaths
Writers from Shanghai
Chinese Christian theologians
Chinese spiritual writers
Republic of China writers
Taiwanese writers
Taiwanese theologians
Taiwanese people from Shanghai